The Punjab cricket team is a first-class cricket team that represents the Indian state of Punjab. They have qualified for only one Ranji Trophy semi-final in the last five seasons and made it to the final in the 2004–05 tournament, where they lost to Railways in the first innings. They also play in other domestic cricket tournaments in India. They have only been winners of the Ranji Trophy once, in the 1992–93 season.

Competition history 
In 1968-69, Punjab competed as a unified team for the first time. Before then, Southern Punjab, Eastern Punjab and Northern Punjab had competed at various times. Punjab has won the Ranji Trophy only once, in 1992–93. That year, they lost the Irani Trophy against a Rest of the Indian team that featured the likes of Rahul Dravid, and Sourav Ganguly. Ajay Jadeja and Nayan Mongia. Punjab has never won the one-day trophy.

Best performances in Ranji Trophy

Home ground
The Punjab cricket team are based and plays their home matches at the Punjab Cricket Association Stadium in Sahibzada Ajit Singh Nagar, established in 1993 on swampland. New cricket grounds of International recognition are expected to come up at Bathinda and one more at Ludhiana or Amritsar as per the saying of the Punjab govt.

The international stadium and the proposed of Punjab cricket team:-

 Inderjit Singh Bindra Stadium, Sahibzada Ajit Singh Nagar. It is a regular test venue for the BCCI and the home of the IPL team Kings XI Punjab.
 Gandhi Sports Complex Ground, Amritsar – hosted 2 ODI matches.
 Gandhi Stadium, Jalandhar – hosted a Test and 3 ODI.
 Dhruve Pandove Stadium, Patiala – the oldest ground in Punjab.
 Maharaja Yadavindra Singh International Cricket Stadium, Mullanpur, Sahibzada Ajit Singh Nagar.
 Shaheed Udham Singh Stadium, Amritsar – proposed in 2011.
 Bathinda International Cricket Stadium, a stadium presented by Bathinda, has been under construction since 2007.

Current squad 
Players with international caps are listed in bold.

Updated as on 31 January 2023

Notable players

Players from Punjab who have played Test cricket for India, along with their year of Test debut 
Mohammad Jahangir Khan (1932)
Lall Singh (1932)
Mohammad Nissar (1932)
Syed Nazir Ali (1932)
Syed Wazir Ali (1932)
Lala Amarnath (1933)
Dilawar Hussain (1934)
Yadavindra Singh (Maharaja of Patiala) (1934)
Baqa Jilani (1936)
Abdul Hafeez Kardar (1946)
Iftikhar Ali Khan Pataudi (Nawab of Pataudi) (1946)
Amir Elahi (1947)
Kanwar Rai Singh (1948)
Vijay Rajindernath (1952)
Vijay Mehra (1955)
Bishan Singh Bedi (1966)
Mohinder Amarnath (1969)
Surinder Amarnath (1976)
Yashpal Sharma (1979)
Yograj Singh (1981)
Navjot Singh Sidhu (1983)
Gursharan Singh (1990)
Aashish Kapoor (1994)
Vikram Rathour (1996)
Harbhajan Singh (1998)
Harvinder Singh (1998)
Sarandeep Singh (2000)
Yuvraj Singh (2003)
Vikram Raj Vir Singh (2006)
Shubman Gill (2020)

Players from Punjab who have played ODI but not Test cricket for India, along with their year of ODI debut 
Bhupinder Singh
Pankaj Dharmani
Reetinder Singh Sodhi
Dinesh Mongia
Manpreet Gony
Rahul Sharma
Barinder Sran
Gurkeerat Singh Mann
Siddarth Kaul

Players from Punjab who have played T20I but not ODI or Test cricket for India, along with their year of T20I debut 
Sandeep Sharma
Mandeep Singh
Mayank Markande
Arshdeep singh

Notable players at the domestic level 
Dhruv Pandove
Uday Kaul
Anmolpreet Singh
Abhishek Sharma 
Lovish Dubey
Harman Singh
Prabhsimran singh

External links
First-class matches played by Punjab at CricketArchive

Indian first-class cricket teams
Cricket
Cricket clubs established in 1890
1890 establishments in British India